Antonio de Espejo (1540–1585) was a Spanish explorer who led an expedition into New Mexico and Arizona in 1582–83.  The expedition created interest in establishing a Spanish colony among the Pueblo Indians of the Rio Grande valley.

Life

Espejo was born about 1540 in Cordova, Spain, and arrived in Mexico in 1571 along with the Chief Inquisitor, Pedro Moya de Contreras, who was sent by the Spanish king to establish an Inquisition. Espejo and his brother became ranchers on the northern frontier of Mexico. In 1581, Espejo and his brother were charged with murder. His brother was imprisoned and Espejo fled to Santa Barbara, Chihuahua, the northernmost outpost of Mexico. He was there when the Chamuscado-Rodriguez expedition returned from New Mexico.

En route to New Mexico

Espejo, a wealthy man, assembled and financed an expedition for the ostensible purpose of ascertaining the fate of two priests who had remained behind with the Pueblos when Chamuscado led his soldiers back to Mexico. Along with fourteen soldiers, a priest, about 30 Indian servants and assistants, and 115 horses he departed from San Bartolome, near Santa Barbara, on November 10, 1582.

Espejo followed the same route as Chamuscado and Rodriguez, down the Conchos River to its junction (La Junta) with the Rio Grande and then up the Rio Grande to the Pueblo villages.

Along the Conchos River, Espejo encountered the Conchos Indians "naked people ... who support themselves on fish, mesquite, mescal, and lechuguilla (agave)". Further downriver, he found Conchos who grew corn, squash, and melons. Leaving the Conchos behind, Espejo next encountered the Passaguates "who were naked like the Conchos" and seemed to have had a similar lifestyle. Next, came the Jobosos who were few in number, shy, and ran away from the Spaniards. All of these tribes had previously been impacted by Spanish slave raids."

Near the junction (La Junta) of the Conchos and the Rio Grande, Espejo entered the territory of the Patarabueyes who attacked his horses, killing three. Espejo succeeded in making peace with them. The Patarabueyes, he said, and the other Indians near La Junta were also called "Jumanos". -- the first use of the name for these Indians who would be prominent on the frontier for nearly two centuries.  To add to the confusion, they were also called Otomoacos and Abriaches. Espejo saw five settlements of Jumanos with a population of about 10,000 people. They lived in low, flat-roofed houses and grew corn, squash, and beans and hunted and fished along the river. They gave Espejo well-tanned deer and bison skins. Leaving the Jumano behind, he passed through the lands of the Caguates or Suma, who spoke the same language as the Jumanos, and the Tanpachoas or Mansos. He found the Rio Grande Valley well populated all the way up to the present site of El Paso, Texas. Upstream from El Paso, the expedition traveled 15 days without seeing any people.

The Pueblos

In February 1583, Espejo arrived at the territory of the Piros, the most southerly of the Pueblo villagers. From there the Spanish continued up the Rio Grande. Espejo described the Pueblo villages as "clean and tidy". The houses were multi-storied and made of adobe bricks. "They make very fine tortillas," Espejo commented, and the Pueblos also served the Spanish turkeys, beans, corns, and pumpkins. The people "did not seem to be bellicose". The southernmost Pueblos had only clubs for weapons plus a few "poor Turkish bows and poorer arrows". Further north, the Indians were better armed and more aggressive. Some of the Pueblo towns were large, Espejo described Zia as having 1,000 houses and 4,000 men and boys. In their farming, the Pueblos used irrigation "with canals and dams, built as if by Spaniards". The only Spanish influence that Espejo noted among the Pueblos was their desire for iron. They would steal any iron article they could find.

Espejo confirmed that the two priests had been killed by the Indians in the pueblo of Puala, near present-day Bernalillo. As the Spanish approached the Pueblo the inhabitants fled to the nearby mountains. The Spanish continued their explorations, east and west of the Rio Grande apparently with no opposition from the Indians. Near Acoma, they noted that a people called Querechos lived in the mountains nearby and traded with the townspeople. These Querechos were Navajo. The closely related Apache of the Great Plains during this period were also called Querechos.

Espejo also visited the Zuni and Hopi and heard stories of silver mines further west. With four men and Hopi guides he went in search of the mines, reaching the Verde River in Arizona, probably in the area of Montezuma Castle National Monument.  He found the mines near present-day Jerome, Arizona, but was unimpressed by their potential. He heard from the local Indians, probably Yavapai, of a large river to the west, undoubtedly a reference to the Colorado.  Among the Hopi and the Zuni, Espejo met several Spanish-speaking Mexican Indians who had been left behind by, or escaped from, the Coronado expedition more than 40 years earlier.

The priest, several of the soldiers, and the Indian assistants decided, despite Espejo's entreaties, to return to Mexico.   It is possible that the priest was offended by the high-handed tactics of Espejo in dealing with the Pueblos. Espejo and eight soldiers stayed behind to look for silver and other precious metals. The little force had a skirmish with the Indians of Acoma Pueblo, apparently because two women slaves or prisoners of the Spanish escaped. The Spanish recaptured the women briefly, but they had to fight their way free.  A Spanish soldier was wounded. In aiding the escape of the women, the Acomans and the Spanish exchanged volleys of harquebus fire, stones, and arrows. The Spanish, thus, were placed on notice that the hospitality of the Pueblos had limits. The Spanish then returned to the Rio Grande Valley where at a village they executed 16 Indians who mocked them and refused them food.

The Spanish quickly departed the Rio Grande and explored eastward, journeying through the Galisteo Basin near the future city of Santa Fe and reaching the large pueblo at Pecos, called Ciquique.

Return journey
Rather than return to the now unfriendly Rio Grande Valley, Espejo decided to return to Mexico via the Pecos River which he called "Rio de Las Vacas" because of the large number of bison the Spaniards encountered during the first six days they followed the river downstream. After descending the river about 300 miles from Ciquique the soldiers met Jumano Indians near Pecos, Texas, who guided them across country, up Toyah Creek, and cross country to La Junta. From here they followed the Conchos River upstream to San Bartolome, their starting place, arriving September 20, 1583. The priest and his companions had also returned safely.  Espejo was the first European to traverse most of the length of the Pecos River.

Espejo died in 1585 in Havana, Cuba.  He was en route to Spain to attempt to get royal permission to establish a Spanish colony in New Mexico. A chronicle of his expeditions was later published by Spanish historian and explorer Baltasar Obregón.

References

16th-century explorers
Rio Conchos
Spanish explorers of North America
Spanish conquistadors
New Mexico Territory
Pre-statehood history of Arizona
16th-century Spanish people
Explorers of the United States
1540 births
1585 deaths